"Love" is the second single from Musiq Soulchild's debut album Aijuswanaseing. 

It debuted on the Billboard Hot R&B/Hip-Hop Songs chart on December 30, 2000, spent 38 weeks on the chart (its last being September 15, 2001), and peaked at #2.

"Love" entered the Billboard Hot 100 on February 17, 2001, spending 22 weeks there, peaking at #24 and falling off on July 7, 2001.

The gospel R&B trio Trin-i-tee 5:7 covered this song in 2002 for their album The Kiss, changing the title to "Lord", making it a gospel song.

The music video features shots of the since closed Lorraine Hotel in Philadelphia.

References

2000 singles
Music videos directed by Marc Klasfeld
Musiq Soulchild songs
Song recordings produced by Dr. Dre
Songs written by Carvin Haggins
Songs written by Andre Harris
2000 songs
Def Jam Recordings singles
Contemporary R&B ballads
Soul ballads
2000s ballads